Meijeriella is a genus of gastropods belonging to the family Enidae.

The species of this genus are found in the Balkans.

Species:

Meijeriella canaliculata 
Meijeriella frivaldskyi 
Meijeriella yildirimi

References

Enidae